Swain County Schools (SCS) or Swain County Public Schools is a school district headquartered in Bryson City, North Carolina.

It serves all sections of Swain County except for the portion on the Eastern Cherokee Reservation, which instead is zoned to Cherokee Central Schools. Native American students in the SCS boundary may also attend Cherokee Central schools.

History
In 2004 Lynne Billings of the Asheville Citizen-Times wrote that the school system was well-regarded in the community.

Schools
 Swain County High School
 Swain County Middle School
 Swain East Elementary School
 Swain West Elementary School
 Bright Adventures Pre-Kindergarten
  it was located in mobile homes that were constructed circa 2001 The district could only enroll about 65-70% of the 4-year olds in the district's service area, and it would need four more classrooms to have all district students served. The district hoped to expand its pre-kindergarten program.

References

External links
 Swain County Schools
School districts in North Carolina
Education in Swain County, North Carolina